Carrie N. Baker is an American lawyer, Sylvia Dlugasch Bauman Chair of American Studies, and Professor of the Study of Women and Gender at Smith College in Northampton, Massachusetts.  She teaches courses on gender, law, public policy, and feminist activism and is affiliated with the American Studies program, the archives concentration, and the public policy minor. She co-founded and is a former co-director of the certificate in Reproductive Health, Rights, and Justice Program offered by the Five College Consortium.

Baker has published three books: The Women's Movement Against Sexual Harassment (Cambridge University Press, 2007), Fighting the US Youth Sex Trade (Cambridge University Press, 2018), and Sexual Harassment Law (Carolina Academic Press, 2020)

Baker has a monthly column in the Daily Hampshire Gazette. She also writes for Ms. Magazine and co-chair of the Ms. Committee of Scholars, which connects academic scholarship to feminist public writing. She is a former president and is now on the advisory board of the Abortion Rights Fund of Western Massachusetts.

Education 
Baker received a B.A. in Philosophy from Yale University in 1987, a J.D. from Emory University School of Law in 1994, and a M.A. and Ph.D. in Women, Gender, and Sexuality Studies from The Institute of Women's Studies at Emory University in 1994 and 2001 respectively. While in law school, she was editor-in-chief of the Emory Law Journal and, from 1994 to 1996, she served as a law clerk to United States District Court Judge Marvin Herman Shoob in Atlanta, Georgia.

Teaching 
Before teaching at Smith College, Baker taught at the Berry College in the department of Sociology and Anthropology. She also chaired the Women's Studies Program.

Awards 
Her first book, The Women's Movement Against Sexual Harassment, won the 2008 National Women's Studies Association Sara A. Whaley book prize.

For her teaching, Baker was awarded the 2006 Dave and Lu Garrett Award for Meritorious Teaching at Berry College, the 2018 Student Government Association Annual Teaching Award at Smith College, and the 2020 Sherrerd Teaching Award at Smith College.

Scholarly Articles

References 

Living people
Yale College alumni
Emory University School of Law alumni
Smith College faculty
Year of birth missing (living people)